This is an incomplete list of people who have served as Lord-Lieutenant of the City of Cork.

James Francis Bernard, 4th Earl of Bandon 1877–1922

Cork City